Alexander Alexandrovich Pyatkov  (born July 31, 1950, Moscow) is a Soviet and Russian film and theater actor.

In 2006 he was awarded the title People's Artist of Russia.

Selected filmography
 Adventures in a City that Does Not Exist (1974)
  Dersu Uzala (1975)
 In the Zone of Special Attention (1978)
 Nameless Star (1979)
 Hit Back (1981)
 Express on Fire (1981)
 The Circus Princess (1982)
 Along Unknown Paths (1982)
 The Story of Voyages (1982)
 We Are from Jazz (1983)
 The Invisible Man (1984)
 Snake Catcher (1985)
 Forgotten Melody for a Flute (1987)
 Where is the Nophelet? (1988)
 I, a Russian soldier (1995)
 Don't Play the Fool... (1997)
 Peculiarities of the Russian Bath (1999)
 The Sovereign's Servant (2007)

References

External links
 
 Александр Пятков

Living people
1950 births
Soviet male actors
Russian male actors
Male actors from Moscow
Honored Artists of the Russian Federation
People's Artists of Russia